Panther Burn is a census-designated place and unincorporated community located along U.S. Route 61 in northwestern Sharkey County, Mississippi, United States. It has a post office with the ZIP code of 38765.

It was first named as a CDP in the 2020 Census which listed a population of 115.

Demographics

2020 census

Note: the US Census treats Hispanic/Latino as an ethnic category. This table excludes Latinos from the racial categories and assigns them to a separate category. Hispanics/Latinos can be of any race.

Education
It is a part of the South Delta School District, which operates South Delta High School.

Popular culture
Panther Burn is the setting of Alice Walker's short story "Roselily", the opening story in her first short story collection, In Love and Trouble: Stories of Black Women. 

The band Tav Falco's Panther Burns, which originated in nearby Memphis, takes its name from the community.

References

Unincorporated communities in Sharkey County, Mississippi
Unincorporated communities in Mississippi
Census-designated places in Sharkey County, Mississippi